Albania competed at the Summer Olympic Games for the first time at the 1972 Summer Olympics in Munich, West Germany. Five competitors, four men and one woman, took part in three events in two sports.

The flagbear at the opening ceremony was Shooter Afërdita Tusha who competed for Albania in the 50 m free pistol together with fellow albanian shooter Fatos Pilkati

She was also the first woman to represent Albania at the Olympics.

Fatos achieved the best result in his category finishing with 546 points in the 24th position, while Aferdita finished her first campaign below the top 50's with 522 points in total.

The other two shooter who represented Albania were Ismail Rama and Beqir Kosova in the  50 m rifle prone discipline. Ismail Rama had the best result for Albania in Shooting as he finished in rank 22 with an score of 594 in the end.

Albania made his debut in Weightlifting with Weightlifter Ymer Pampuri, in the    Men's 60 kg Event. He became the first Albanian to break a World record as he lifted in the military press 127,5 KG. He finished this category in first place. Despite the good start he wasn't able to keep this form up as finished his next category only in 12th place. As he finished his olympics in the 9th place. The best placement at this Summer Olympics for Albania.

Shooting

Four shooters, three men and one woman, represented Albania in 1972.

Open

Weightlifting

Men

References

Nations at the 1972 Summer Olympics
1972
1972 in Albanian sport